The Little Goose Island, part of the Badger Group within the Furneaux Group, is a  unpopulated flat, round granite island, located in Bass Strait, lying west of the Flinders and Cape Barren islands, Tasmania, south of Victoria, in south-eastern Australia. The island is contained within a nature reserve and is part of the Chalky, Big Green and Badger Island Groups Important Bird Area.

Fauna
Recorded breeding seabird and wader species are little penguin, short-tailed shearwater, Pacific gull, sooty oystercatcher and black-faced cormorant.  The metallic skink is present.

See also

 List of islands of Tasmania

References

Furneaux Group
Protected areas of Tasmania
Important Bird Areas of Tasmania
Islands of Bass Strait
Islands of North East Tasmania